Pavlína Šulcová (born 9 May 1986) is a road cyclist from the Czech Republic. She participated at the 2012 UCI Road World Championships.

References

External links
 profile at Procyclingstats.com

1986 births
Czech female cyclists
Living people
Place of birth missing (living people)